Cameron Michael Doyle (born 12 July 1964) is a former Australian rules footballer who played with Collingwood in the Victorian Football League (VFL).

Doyle, who came to the club from Preston, was picked up after being a part of Preston's premiership VFA side of 1984 where he was a starting back pocket. Doyle would go on to play four games for Collingwood in the 1985 VFL season, which included a three-goal debut, against North Melbourne. Doyle's 1985 season consisted of an average of 14 disposals, 5 marks, and 1.25 goals. Doyle's career-high would come in his third game a clash against Melbourne in Round 14 at the MCG. Doyle would boast a total of 19 disposals which included 16 kicks, 7 marks, and 1 goal. In Cameron's fourth game against Essendon at Victoria Park, he dislocated his shoulder just minutes before halftime. He was on track to have his career-best game with a total of 14 disposals and 7 marks.   As a result of this injury he didn't feature at all in 1986 season before coming back and playing two games in the 1987 season. In October 1988, having not made a VFL appearance that year, Doyle was dropped from the Collingwood list. 

Doyle then became a member of Coburg's 1989 premiership team. 

Doyle now runs a memorabilia shop in Fitzroy called Memorabilia on Smith. He is married with three kids.

References

1964 births
Australian rules footballers from Victoria (Australia)
Collingwood Football Club players
Coburg Football Club players
Preston Football Club (VFA) players
Living people